The 1992 Major League Baseball All-Star Game was the 63rd playing of the midsummer classic between the all-stars of the American League (AL) and National League (NL), the two leagues comprising Major League Baseball. The game was held on July 14, 1992, at Jack Murphy Stadium in San Diego, the home of the San Diego Padres of the National League. The game resulted in the American League defeating the National League 13–6.

In the eighth inning, Charles Nagy became the only pitcher to get a hit in an All-Star Game in the designated hitter era. It was a single, and he scored a few batters later.

Rosters
Players in italics have since been inducted into the National Baseball Hall of Fame.

American League

National League

Notes

Game

Umpires

Harvey, a California resident, was named crew chief to honor him for 31 seasons of service to the National League. He retired at the end of the 1992 season and was inducted into the Hall of Fame in 2010.

Starting lineups

Game summary

External links
Baseball Almanac
Baseball-Reference.com

Major League Baseball All-Star Game
Major League Baseball All-Star Game
Baseball competitions in San Diego
Major League Baseball All Star Game
1990s in San Diego
July 1992 sports events in the United States